João Antônio Barbosa Arroyo (born 1 July 1989) is a Brazilian male mixed martial artist who competes in the Middleweight division. He has formerly competed for the Ultimate Fighting Championship.

Background
After graduating with a business degree and working for a year as a marketing assistant, Arroyo decided to pursue MMA professionally, after practising martial arts through most of his youth.

Mixed martial arts career

Early career
Starting his career in 2014, Arroyo compiled a 7–2 record on the regional Brazilian scene, capturing the Salvaterra Marajó Fight Middleweight Championship in the process. After this, he was invited onto Dana White's Contender Series Brazil 1, where he won a unanimous decision against Diego Henrique da Silva. This win did not however earn him a UFC contract. Arroyo was invited back the next year to Dana White's Contender Series 20, where he faced Stephen Regman and winning the bout via arm-triangle choke in the second round. This time, Arroyo earned a UFC contract for his performance.

Ultimate Fighting Championship
Arroyo was expected to make his promotional debut against Kevin Holland on 16 November 2019 at UFC Fight Night: Błachowicz vs. Jacaré. However, in late September, promotion officials elected to remove Holland from the bout in favor of a matchup against Brendan Allen on 18 October 2019 at UFC on ESPN 6. Alessio Di Chirico was then expected to face Arroyo, however, it was announced on 24 October 2019 that Arroyo was scheduled to fight André Muniz instead. Arroyo lost the fight via unanimous decision.

Arroyo was scheduled to face Trevin Giles on 8 February 2020 at UFC 247. However Arroyo pulled out a day before the event due to medical issues and was replaced by James Krause.

Arroyo was expected to face Andreas Michailidis at UFC Fight Night: Felder vs. dos Anjos on 14 November 2020. However, Michailidis withdrew on 23 October due to undisclosed reasons and was replaced Eryk Anders. At the weigh-ins, Anders weighed in at 187.5 pounds, one and a half pounds over the middleweight non-title fight limit. The bout was to proceed at catchweight, and Anders fined 20% of his purse, which would go to Arroyo. Anders eventually pulled out of the fight the next day as a consequence of the weigh-cut and the bout was canceled.

Arroyo, as a replacement for Antônio Braga Neto, faced Deron Winn on 19 December 2020 at UFC Fight Night: Thompson vs. Neal at a catchweight of 196 lbs. Arroyo lost the fight via unanimous decision.

Arroyo was scheduled to face Tom Breese on 5 June 2021 at UFC Fight Night: Rozenstruik vs. Sakai. However the fight would be cancelled a few hours before it was to take place due to medical issues suffered by Breese.

Arroyo faced Joaquin Buckley on 18 September 2021 at UFC Fight Night: Smith vs. Spann. He lost the fight via knockout in round three.

After the loss, Arroyo was announced to no longer be a part of the UFC roster.

Post UFC 
After winning via triangle choke on the Brazilian regional scene, Arroyo faced Evgeniy Ignatiev on August 26, 2022 at RCC 12. He lost the bout via unanimous decision.

Championships and accomplishments

Mixed martial arts 

 Salvaterra Marajó Fight 
 SMF Middleweight Championship (One time)

Mixed martial arts record

|-
|Loss
|align=center|10–6
|Mikhail Ragozin
|Decision (unanimous)
|RCC 12
|
|align=center|3
|align=center|5:00
|Yekaterinburg, Russia
|
|-
|Win
|align=center|10–5
|Johnson Bacelar
|Technical Submission (triangle choke)
|Dispute Fight Series 1
|
|align=center|1
|align=center|2:20
|Santarém, Brazil
|
|-
|Loss
|align=center|9–5
|Joaquin Buckley
|KO (punches)
|UFC Fight Night: Smith vs. Spann
|
|align=center|3 
|align=center|2:26
|Las Vegas, Nevada, United States
|
|-
|Loss
|align=center|9–4
|Deron Winn
|Decision (unanimous)
|UFC Fight Night: Thompson vs. Neal
|
|align=center|3
|align=center|5:00
|Las Vegas, Nevada, United States
|
|-
|Loss
|align=center|9–3
|André Muniz
|Decision (unanimous)
|UFC Fight Night: Błachowicz vs. Jacaré
|
|align=center|3
|align=center|5:00
|São Paulo, Brazil
|
|-
|Win
|align=center|9–2
|Stephen Regman
|Submission (arm-triangle choke)
|Dana White's Contender Series 20
|
|align=center|2
|align=center|3:31
|Las Vegas, Nevada, United States
|
|-
|Win
|align=center|8–2
|Diego Henrique
|Decision (unanimous)
|Dana White's Contender Series Brazil 1
|
|align=center|3
|align=center|5:00
|Las Vegas, Nevada, United States
|
|-
|Win
|align=center|7–2
|Adriano Miranda
|Submission (rear-naked choke)
|Salvaterra Marajó Fight 8
|
|align=center|1
|align=center|3:03
|Salvaterra, China
|
|-
| Win
| align=center|6–2
| Antônio Soares
| KO (kick to the body)
| Pará Fight 1
| 
| align=center|1
| align=center|1:54
|Belém, Brazil
|
|-
| Win
| align=center| 5–2
| Trevor Carlson
| KO (knee)
|Fierce FC 6
| 
| align=center|1
| align=center|0:19
| Tooele, Utah, United States
| 
|-
| Loss
| align=center| 4–2
| Herdem Alacabek
|Submission (rear-naked choke)
|LFA 13
|
|align=center|1
|align=center|3:51
|Burbank, California, United States
|
|-
| Win
| align=center| 4–1
| Felipe Oliveira
| Submission (arm-triangle choke)
| Marajo Open Fight 2
| 
|align=center|1
|align=center|2:07
| Soure, Brazil
| 
|-
| Loss
| align=center| 3–1
| Brendson Ribeiro
| Submission (guillotine choke)
| Revelation Fighting Championship 2
| 
| align=center| 1
| align=center| 3:59
| Belém, Brazil
| 
|-
| Win
| align=center| 3–0
| Ailton da Silva
|KO (head kick)
|Fusao de Artes Marciais 5
|
|align=center|1
|align=center|2:37
|Soure, Brazil
| 
|-
| Win
| align=center| 2–0
| Pedro Henrique
| Submission (arm-triangle choke)
| Jurunense Open Fight MMA 8
| 
| align=center| 1
| align=center| 3:34
| Belém, Brazil
|
|-
| Win
| align=center| 1–0
| Gabriel Batalha
| TKO (punches)
| Fusao de Artes Marciais 3
| 
| align=center| 1
| align=center| 0:58
| Soure, Brazil
|

See also 
 List of male mixed martial artists

References

External links 
  
 

1989 births
Living people
Brazilian male mixed martial artists
Middleweight mixed martial artists
Mixed martial artists utilizing Muay Thai
Brazilian Muay Thai practitioners
Ultimate Fighting Championship male fighters